American Fool is the fifth studio album by John Mellencamp, released under the stage name John Cougar in 1982. The album was his commercial breakthrough, holding the No. 1 position on the Billboard album chart for nine weeks.

A remastered version of American Fool was released on Mercury/Island/UMe on March 29, 2005; it includes one bonus track, the previously unreleased title track.

Production
Producer Don Gehman stated in a 2011 interview that American Fool was fraught with layers of problems. "We had 20 or so songs, we had a record company that was hoping we were making a Neil Diamond‑type album, and after we spent two or three months in the studio recording these songs and mixing them to the best of our ability, I can remember an A&R guy in a pink shirt coming in to listen to them and basically thinking we had nothing. At that point, they put a stop to the project. We had ‘Jack & Diane,’ we had ‘Hand To Hold On To,’ we had ‘Weakest Moments’ — we had some good songs — and while I don’t know the precise nature of the discussions that took place, Riva went from wanting to get a new producer to not even wanting John on the label anymore. Finally, they came around to letting us finish it but wanting to hear the new songs we were going to cut."

According to a 1983 article in the Toledo Blade, the song "Danger List" originated when Mellencamp heard his guitarist Larry Crane playing some chords in a basement rehearsal room. "I turned on the tape recorder and sang 30 verses,” Mellencamp explained. "I just made them up. Then I went and weeded out the ones I didn't like."

Track listing
All songs written by John Mellencamp, except where noted.

 "Hurts So Good" (Mellencamp, George M. Green) – 3:42
 "Jack & Diane" – 4:16
 "Hand to Hold On To" – 3:25
 "Danger List" (Mellencamp, Larry Crane) – 4:28
 "Can You Take It" – 3:35
 "Thundering Hearts" (Mellencamp, Green) – 3:40
 "China Girl" (Joe New, Jeff Silbar) – 3:34
 "Close Enough" – 3:38
 "Weakest Moments" – 4:07
 "American Fool" (2005 re-issue bonus track) – 3:46

Charts

Personnel
 John Mellencamp – lead vocals, guitar, tambourine
 Larry Crane – guitar, background vocals
 Mike Wanchic – guitar, background vocals
 Kenny Aronoff – drums, LinnDrum
 George "Chocolate" Perry – bass
 Mick Ronson – guitar, background vocals
 Robert "Ferd" Frank – bass, background vocals
 Eric Rosser – keyboards
 Dave Parman – background vocals

Notes 

John Mellencamp albums
1982 albums
Albums produced by Don Gehman
Riva Records albums